Sunrise is a song by the British rock band Uriah Heep, originally released on their fifth studio album, The Magician's Birthday, in 1972. The song was written by Ken Hensley and sung by David Byron. The song is considered one of the band's classics, and it also became famous for its live performances in late 1972 and 1973. It was included, as the opening track, on the band's first ever live album, Uriah Heep Live, in 1973.
The song was recorded and mixed at Lansdowne Studios, London, in September 1972, and released on The Magician's Birthday in November of the same year. The song is also the B-side of the single "Spider Woman".

Appearances in other albums
The song has been appeared in many of Uriah Heep's live, compilation, video and even studio albums since it was originally recorded.

Uriah Heep Live in 1973
The Best of Uriah Heep in 1976
Echoes in the Dark in 1991
Platinum: The Ultimate Collection in 1995
A Time of Revelation in 1996
Classic Heep: An Anthology in 1998
Travellers in Time: An Anthology, Vol. 1 in 1999
The Legend Continues in 2001
20th Century Masters: The Millennium Collection: The Best of Uriah Heep in 2001
Electrically Driven in 2001
Sailing the Sea of Light in 2001
Remasters: The Official Anthology in 2001
The Box Miniatures in 2002
The Magician's Birthday Party in 2002
The Ultimate Collection in 2003
Gold: Looking Back 1970–2001 in 2004
Classic Heep Live From the Byron Era in 2004
Chapter & Verse in 2005
Uriah Heep Hit Pac - 5 Series in 2008
Celebration in 2009
Live at Sweden Rock in 2010
Live in Armenia in 2011
Official Bootleg in 2011
Official Bootleg Vol. 2: Live in Budapest, Hungary 2010 in 2011
Official Bootleg Vol.4: Live From Brisbane 2011 in 2011
Uriah Heep Official Bootleg: 19.12.9 Gusswerk in 2011

Personnel
Mick Box — Guitar
Lee Kerslake — Drums
Gary Thain — Bass guitar
Ken Hensley — Keyboards
David Byron — Lead vocals

Covers
Soviet group VIA Iveria covered the song on their 1974 LP Voskhod Solnca.

References

Uriah Heep (band) songs
Songs written by Ken Hensley